Tuomo Hämäläinen (born 3 April 1945) is a Finnish former freestyle swimmer. He competed in three events at the 1964 Summer Olympics.

References

External links
 

1945 births
Living people
Finnish male freestyle swimmers
Olympic swimmers of Finland
Swimmers at the 1964 Summer Olympics
People from Kotka
Sportspeople from Kymenlaakso